Elachista modesta  is a moth of the family Elachistidae. It is found in Greece (Lesbos and Rhodes) and Turkey.

The forewing ground colour is creamy white, variably irrorated by ochreous brown scales. The hindwings are dark grey above, with paler yellowish
grey fringe scales.

Taxonomy
Elachista modesta was previously treated as a synonym of Elachista catalana, but was recently reinstated as a valid species.

References

modesta
Moths described in 1978
Moths of Asia
Moths of Europe